Udhna Junction railway station  is a railway station serving Udhna town, in Surat  district of Gujarat State of India. It is under Mumbai WR railway division of Western Railway zone of Indian Railways. It is located on New Delhi–Mumbai main line of the Indian Railways.

It is located at 14 m above sea level and has three platforms. As of 2016, electrified double Broad Gauge railway line exist and at this station, 59 trains stops, 3 trains originates and 3 trains terminate. Surat Airport, is at distance of 13 kilometres.

Major trains

Following trains start from Udhna Junction railway station:

 Udhna–Danapur Express
 Jaynagar–Udhna Antyodaya Express
 Udhna–Banaras Express

Following trains halt at Udhna Junction railway station:

 Bandra Terminus–Patna Weekly Express
 Shramik Express
 Bandra Terminus–Saharsa Humsafar Express
 Howrah–Ahmedabad Superfast Express
 Gorakhpur–Bandra Terminus Express (via Barhni)
 Udyog Karmi Express
 Gujarat Queen
 Flying Ranee
 Tapti Ganga Express
 Surat–Bhagalpur Express
 Surat–Amravati Express
 Navjeevan Express
 Saurashtra Express

Gallery

See also
List of tourist attractions in Surat

References

External links
 

Railway stations in Surat district
Mumbai WR railway division
Railway junction stations in Gujarat
Transport in Surat
Buildings and structures in Surat